Singleton and Cocking Tunnels is a  biological Site of Special Scientific Interest between Chichester and Midhurst in West Sussex. It is also a Special Area of Conservation.

These disused railway tunnels are the fifth most important sites for hibernating bats in Britain and the most important in south-east England. They are the only known location in the country for the greater mouse-eared bat. Other species include Natterer's, Daubenton's, Brandt's and brown long-eared bats.

The site is private land with no public access.

References

Sites of Special Scientific Interest in West Sussex
Special Areas of Conservation in England
Railway tunnels in England